Surface Science Reports is a peer-reviewed scientific journal published by North-Holland that covers the physics and chemistry of surfaces. It was established in 1981. It is the review journal corresponding to the journals Surface Science and Surface Science Letters.

Abstracting and indexing 
This journal is abstracted and indexed by:

According to the Journal Citation Reports, Surface Science Reports has a 2020 impact factor of 12.267.

References

External links 
 

Physics review journals
Materials science journals
Publications established in 1981
Elsevier academic journals
Monthly journals
English-language journals